Huichihuayan is a town located in the Huehuetlán municipality in the southeast region of San Luis Potosí, Mexico. With a population of over 2,000, it is the largest town in its municipality.

References

Municipalities of San Luis Potosí